Hamish John William Gardiner (born 4 January 1991) is an Australian-born Scottish cricketer. He made his One Day International (ODI) debut against Australia on 3 September 2013  at The Grange Club.

References

1991 births
Living people
Scottish cricketers
Scotland One Day International cricketers
Cricketers from Brisbane
Cricketers at the 2015 Cricket World Cup